Severny is a rural locality (a settlement) in Bauntovsky District, Republic of Buryatia, Russia. The population was 409 as of 2010. There are 11 streets.

Geography 
Severny is located 33 km southwest of Bagdarin (the district's administrative centre) by road.

References 

Rural localities in Bauntovsky District